A registered nurse (RN) is a nurse who has graduated or successfully passed a nursing program from a recognized nursing school and met the requirements outlined by a country, state, province or similar government-authorized licensing body to obtain a nursing license. An RN's scope of practice is determined by legislation, and is regulated by a professional body or council.

Registered nurses are employed in a wide variety of professional settings, and often specialize in a field of practice. They may be responsible for supervising care delivered by other healthcare workers, including student nurses, licensed practical nurses (except in Canada), unlicensed assistive personnel, and less-experienced RNs.

Registered nurses must usually meet a minimum practice hours requirement and undertake continuing education to maintain their license. Furthermore, there is often a requirement that an RN remain free from serious criminal convictions.

History
Florence Nightingale was a British nurse who provided the foundation of the nursing profession. Nightingale obtained her experience during the Crimean War. St. Thomas Hospital and the Nightingale Training School for Nurses was established in 1860 by Florence Nightingale.

The registration of nurses by nursing councils or boards began in the early twentieth century. New Zealand registered the first nurse in 1901 with the establishment of the Nurses Registration Act. Nurses were required to complete three years of training and pass a state-administered examination. Registration ensured a degree of consistency in the education of new nurses, and the title was usually protected by law. After 1905 in California, for example, it became a misdemeanour to claim to be an RN without a certificate of registration. Now typical requirements for an RN licence in the United States include earning either an associate degree (community college) or a baccalaureate degree (college or university) in nursing and passing an examination.

Registration acts allowed authorities a degree of control over who was admitted to the profession. Requirements varied by location, but often included a stipulation that the applicant must be "of good moral character" and must not have mental or physical conditions that rendered them unable to practice.

Before the 1870s, most people were cared for at home by family members. The view on nursing began to change as more medical advances were made during the end of the 19th century and leading into the beginning of the 20th century.

As nursing became more of an international profession, with RNs traveling to find work or improved working conditions and wages, some countries began implementing standardized language tests (notably the International English Language Testing System).

Benefits of nursing
When obtaining a nursing degree, there are personal benefits that come with it. One personal benefit is that nursing is a highly respected position. Another personal advantage is the availability of jobs; nurses are in high demand. Nursing also provides many different possibilities of employment, because with a nursing degree, there are many positions that fall under this category. Being able to explore multiple options gives someone the chance to find the most suitable job for themselves.

Patients benefit from having a sufficient number of nurses to meet the clinic's or hospital's needs. As the number of nurses increases, the quality of life for the patients increases as well.

Issues within registered nursing 
Nursing is a profession responsible for providing a high quality of care and maintaining the well-being of patients. With that being said, nurses tend to feel overwhelmed for various reasons. One reason nurses tend to feel overwhelmed has to do with the result of missed nursing care when the workload becomes very immense for nurses. Many nurses face an unbearable workload in their daily tasks, making lots of room for error and mishaps. Not having time to complete tasks and the level of the staffing also plays a huge role in how nurses may miss aspects of nursing care. An indicator of an overwhelming workload that nurses face correlates with missed nursing care and activities. Due to the missed care and actives, nurses may also gain feelings of stress and anxiety within their work environments. It is also common for nurses to experience sleep disturbance which can result in losing sleep or not being able to fall asleep. Although not all nurses will face these issues, they are very common within the nursing field and it is likely for some registered nurses to experience these issues and feelings.

By nation

Australia
Nursing registration in Australia has been at a national level since 2010, since the inception of the Nursing and Midwifery Board of Australia (NMBA), which forms part of the Australian Health Practitioner Regulation Agency (AHPRA). Prior to 2010, Nursing registration in Australia was administered individually by each state and territory.

The title 'Registered Nurse' (also known in the state of Victoria as a 'Division 1 Nurse') is granted to a nurse who has successfully completed a board-approved course in the field of nursing, as outlined by education and registration standards defined by the NMBA. Registered Nurses are also required to meet certain other standards to fulfil registration standards as outlined by the NMBA, and these can include continuing professional development, recency of practice, criminal history checks and competency in the English language. A nurse who is registered with the NMBA, and as such AHPRA, is free to practice in any state or territory in Australia, providing they meet the governing boards requirements and the individual state/territory legislative requirements, such as working with children checks and individual police checks for that state or territory.

Educational requirements for an entry-level Registered Nurse are at the level of bachelor's degree in Australia, and can range in two to four years in length with three years being the national average. Some universities offer a two-year 'fast track' bachelor's degree, whereby a students study three years worth of coursework compressed in a two-year period. This is made possible by reducing summer and winter semester breaks and utilising three semesters per year compared to two. Some universities also offer combined degrees which allow the graduate to exit the program with a Masters in Nursing, e.g.: Bachelor of Science/Master of Nursing, and these are generally offered over a four-year period.

Postgraduate nursing education is widespread in Australia and is encouraged by employing bodies such as state health services (e.g. New South Wales Health). There are many varying courses and scholarships available which provide a bachelor-level Registered Nurse the opportunity to 'up-skill' and assume an extended scope of practice. Such courses are offered at all levels of the post graduate spectrum and range from graduate certificate to master's degree and provide a theoretical framework for a bachelor level Registered nurse to take up an advanced practice position such as Clinical Nurse Specialist (CNS), Clinical Nurse Consultant (CNC) and Nurse Practitioner (NP).

Rural and Remote nursing is an important sub-speciality within Australia and Registered Nurses with advanced practice skills and of which have undertaken further training, such as Pharmacotherapeutics for Remote Area Nurses (RAN's), Immunisation Certificate, Remote Emergency Care / Remote Pre Hospital Trauma Certification and Midwifery Emergency Care Courses, permit a generalist Registered Nurse to undertake an advanced scope of practice to operate autonomously within certain clinical situations under the guidance of a 'standard treatment manual' such as the Central Australian Remote Practitioners Association (CARPA) manuals as opposed to the direct order of a medical practitioner whilst practising in a remote/isolated setting. A Registered Nurse at this level would be professionally referred to as a 'Remote Area Nurse' or 'Clinical Nurse Specialist - Speciality'.

Canada
In all Canadian provinces except Quebec, newly registered nurses are required to have a Bachelor of Science in Nursing. This is either achieved through a four-year university (or collaborative) program or through a bridging program for registered practical nurses or licensed practical nurses. Some universities also offer compressed programs for applicants already holding a bachelor's degree in another field.

Prior to 2015, initial licensure as an RN required passing the Canadian Registered Nurse Examination (CRNE) offered by the Canadian Nurses Association. As of 2015, for initial licensure, Canadian RNs must pass the NCLEX-RN exam offered by the National Council of State Boards of Nursing. In Quebec, the 'Ordre des infirmières et infirmiers du Québec' (Quebec Order of Nurses) administers their own licensing exam for registration within the province.

Denmark
In Denmark, nurses are certified by the Danish Ministry of Health. It is also the ministry that keeps track of violations and can retract individual authorization.

Hong Kong

Applicants must complete a pre-registration nursing program lasting not less than 3 years to enroll as registered nurses. Applicants trained outside Hong Kong must have a practicing certificate recognized by the Nursing Council of Hong Kong and pass the Licensing Examination for Registration.

India

In the Republic of India nursing is regulated by the Indian Nursing Council.

Malaysia
In Malaysia, nursing is regulated by the Ministry of Health Malaysia Nursing Division.

United Kingdom

United States
In the US, a registered nurse is a professional clinician who has completed at least an associate degree in nursing or a hospital-based diploma program, followed by successfully completing the NCLEX-RN examination for initial licensure. Other requirements vary by state. More information about the NCLEX-RN examination and specific state nursing boards is provided by the National Council of State Boards of Nursing.  A BSN degree is preferred by many employers. To obtain state licensure, applicants must also meet clinical nursing requirements and pass the NCLEX-RN. Six weeks prior to graduation, students may submit an application for licensure and then sign up for the NCLEX-RN. 

Although associate degree programs are often two years, Associate of Science in Nursing (ASN) degrees frequently take three years to complete because of the increased volume of undergraduate coursework related to the profession of nursing, sometimes as part of the program itself and sometimes as prerequisites for admission. Bachelor of Science in Nursing (BSN) degrees include more thorough coursework in leadership and community health, as well as more clinical hours, and can be completed as an extension of an Associate program or standalone. Accelerated versions of both exist, and are considered particularly challenging due to the increased course-load necessary to complete the program in a short time. Some employers, especially hospitals, may require a bachelor's degree even for entry-level positions, however it is also increasingly common for hospitals to hire ASN-licensed individuals for limited practice, under the condition that the individual complete a BSN within a designated time-frame, typically 2–3 years.

Specialty certification is available through organizations such as the American Nurses Credentialing Center, a subsidiary of the American Nurses Association. After meeting the eligibility requirements and passing the appropriate specialty certification exam, the designation of Registered Nurse – Board Certified (RN-BC) credential is granted.

Registered Nurses can work in a variety of settings including hospitals, physicians' offices, nursing homes, and home health care services. The median pay for a registered nurse in 2016, according to the Bureau of Labor Statistics, was $68,450.00 per year with a bachelor's degree. RNs can progress to become clinical nurse specialists, nurse practitioners, certified nurse midwives, or nurse anesthetists after obtaining a graduate nursing degree. 

In some states, the law allows nurses with higher-level degrees, such as Masters of Science in Nursing (MSN) or Doctor of Nursing Practice (DNP) to work with increased autonomy, permitting them to practice limited medicine including sometimes even the prescription of medication without the official supervision of a licensed physician (MD or DO). However, a number of advanced nursing degree programs are sufficiently specialized for work within a hospital setting (for example, Nurse Anesthetist) that it is uncommon for such nurses to run their own medical practice.

Nurses in the United States follow the Nurse Practice Act (NPA) which are laws that protect the public's health and welfare by outlining the safe practices of nursing. All states and territories in the U.S. have a nurse practice act. The rules and regulations may vary from state to state. It is important to know the current laws governing nursing practices in their state.

Typical requirements to get into a nursing school: High School diploma, required GPA for school of choice, admissions application, personal essay, personal interview, teacher recommendations, volunteer experience (preferably in healthcare), application fee, test of English as a Foreign Language (TOEFL) if applicable, minimum SAT scores or TEAS. Students who wish to pursue either an ADN or a BSN in nursing must first fulfill the necessary liberal arts, math, and scientific prerequisites. Basic anatomy, physiology, biology, psychology, and anatomy are frequently required courses for nursing programs. A minimum "C" grade in these courses is frequently needed for admission to nursing schools.

Economics
As of 2011, there are 2.24 million registered nurses in China. In 2014, the United States had approximately 2,751,000 registered nurses and Canada had just over 250,000. In the US and Canada this works out to approximately eight nurses per 1,000 people. According to the Bureau of Labor Statistics, registered nursing jobs are projected to grow by 15% between 2016 and 2026, which is much faster than the average overall rate. The growth rate in the United States has a number of reasons, including an increased interest in preventive care, an increase in chronic illnesses, and the demands of services required by the baby boom generation. The highest-paid registered nurses in the United States are in California. California cities often comprise the top five highest-paying metropolitan areas for registered nurses in the country. Most registered nurses start working with competitive salaries. The median annual salary for registered nurses was $80,000 per year as of June 2020, according to the Bureau of Labor Statistics (BLS.) The lowest 10 percent of RN's earned less than $70,000, and the highest 10 percent earned more than $101,360 for 2015.

See also
 Advanced practice nurse
 Nurse registry
 Nursing credentials and certifications
 Nursing education
 Nursing shortage
 Registered Dental Nurse
 Registered psychiatric nurse

References

Health care occupations
Healthcare occupations in the United Kingdom
Professional titles and certifications
Nursing credentials and certifications

es:Enfermeria